Delhi University (DU), formally the University of Delhi, is a collegiate central university located in Delhi, India. It was founded in 1922 by an Act of the Central Legislative Assembly and is recognized as an Institute of Eminence (IoE) by the University Grants Commission (UGC). As a collegiate university, its main functions are divided between the academic departments of the university and constituent colleges. Consisting of three colleges, two faculties, and 750 students at its founding, the University of Delhi has since become India's largest institution of higher learning and among the largest in the world. The university has 16 faculties and 86 departments distributed across its North and South campuses, and remaining colleges across the region. It has 91 constituent colleges. The Vice President of India serves as the university chancellor.

History
The University of Delhi was established in 1922 as a unitary, teaching and residential university by an Act of the then Central Legislative Assembly of the British India. Hari Singh Gour served as the university's first Vice-Chancellor from 1922 to 1926. Only four colleges existed in Delhi at the time: St. Stephen's College founded in 1881, Hindu College founded in 1899, Zakir Husain Delhi College (then known as The Delhi College), founded in 1792 and Ramjas College founded in 1917, which were subsequently affiliated to the university. The university initially had two faculties (Arts and Science) and approximately 750 students.

The seat of power in British India had been transferred from Calcutta to Delhi in 1911. The Viceregal Lodge Estate became the residence of the Viceroy of India until October 1933, when it was given to the University of Delhi. Since then, it has housed the office of the vice-chancellor and other offices.

When Sir Maurice Gwyer came to India in 1937 to serve as Chief Justice of British India, he became the Vice-Chancellor of the University of Delhi. During his time, postgraduate teaching courses were introduced and laboratories were established at the university. Members of the faculty included Daulat Singh Kothari in Physics and Panchanan Maheshwari in Botany. Gwyer has been called the "maker of university". He served as Vice-Chancellor until 1950.

The silver jubilee year of the university in 1947 coincided with India's independence, and the national flag was hoisted in the main building for the first time by Vijayendra Kasturi Ranga Varadaraja Rao. In that year there was no convocation ceremony due to the partition of India. Instead, a special ceremony was held in 1948, attended by then Prime Minister of India Jawaharlal Nehru, as well as by Lord Mountbatten, Lady Mountbatten, Abul Kalam Azad, Zakir Husain and Shanti Swaroop Bhatnagar. Twenty-five years later the golden jubilee celebrations of 1973 were attended by then Prime Minister of India Indira Gandhi, Satyajit Ray, Amrita Pritam and M. S. Subbulakshmi.

Present form
The university has grown into one of the largest universities in India. There are 16 faculties, 86 academic departments, 91 colleges spread across the city, with 132,435 regular students (114,494 undergraduates and 17,941 postgraduates). There are 261,169 students in non-formal education programmes (258,831 undergraduates and 2,338 postgraduates). DU's chemistry, geology, zoology, sociology and history departments have been awarded the status of Centres of Advanced Studies. In addition, a number of the university's departments receive grants under the Special Assistance Programme of the University Grants Commission in recognition of their outstanding academic work.

From the year 2022 DU changed its admission pattern from the 12th percentage mark based to CUET (Central Universities Common Entrance Test). Now it will admit students based on their CUET scores. And the 12th class percentage marks will act as a tie-breaker for students securing the same CUET scores.

DU is one of the most sought-after institutions of higher education in India. It also has one of the highest publication counts among Indian universities.

The annual honorary degree ceremony of the university has been conferred upon several people, which includes film actor Amitabh Bachchan, former Chief Minister of Delhi Sheila Dikshit, cartoonist R. K. Laxman, chemist C. N. R. Rao and former Prime Minister of the United Kingdom Gordon Brown.

Campus

There are 91 colleges affiliated to the University of Delhi, spread across Delhi. North Campus and South Campus serve as the two main campuses of the university. Zakir Husain Delhi College, which is situated in the central part of New Delhi, is the oldest college in Delhi carrying 300 years of legacy.

North Campus

The North Campus hosts the three founding colleges of the university. It now has the School of Open Learning, the Faculty of Arts, the Faculty of Law, and 13 colleges including Kirori Mal College, Lady Irwin College, Daulat Ram College, Hansraj College, Hindu College, Indraprastha College for Women, Mata Sundri College for Women, Lakshmibai College, Miranda House, Sri Guru Tegh Bahadur Khalsa College, Ramjas College, St. Stephen's College, Shri Ram College of Commerce, Satyawati College, Shyam Lal College. The campus also houses centres for graduate study and research, which include the Cluster Innovation Centre, Delhi School of Economics, Delhi School Of Journalism and the Ambedkar Center for Biomedical Research (ACBR).

South Campus
The South Campus was opened in 1973 as part of the university's expansion plan. It moved to its present location on Benito Juarez Marg, near Dhaula Kuan, in 1984, and covers 69 acres. Its constituent colleges include, Aryabhatta College, Ayurvedic and Unani Tibbia College, Gargi College, Atma Ram Sanatan Dharma College, PGDAV College, Jesus and Mary College, Ramanujan College, Maitreyi College, Motilal Nehru College, Motilal Nehru College Evening, Ram Lal Anand College, Sri Venkateswara College, Lady Shri Ram College, Deen Dayal Upadhyaya College, the Delhi College of Arts and Commerce, the Institute of Home Economics, the College of Vocational Studies, Sri Aurobindo College, Kamala Nehru College, Dyal Singh College, Shaheed Bhagat Singh College and Rajkumari Amrit Kaur College of Nursing.

Hostel facilities
Some colleges of Delhi University offer hostel facilities to students but this facility is limited to a specific number of colleges. The allotment of hostels is also done on a merit basis. Only 20 colleges of Delhi University provide hostel facilities to students.

Organisation and administration

Governance
The President of India is the Visitor, the Vice President of India is the Chancellor and the Chief Justice of India is the Pro-Chancellor of the university. The Court, the Executive Council, the Academic Council and the Finance Committee are the administrative authorities of the university.

The University Court is the supreme authority of the university and has the power to review the acts of the Executive Council and the Academic Council. The Executive Council is the highest executive body of the university. The Academic Council is the highest academic body of the university and is responsible for the maintenance of standards of instruction, education and examination within the university. It has the right to advise the Executive Council on all academic matters. The Finance Committee is responsible for recommending financial policies, goals, and budgets.

Colleges

Though the colleges are all constituent to the University of Delhi, as it is a collegiate university, depending upon the funding Delhi Colleges broadly fall into three categories:
 Colleges established by Educational or Charitable Trusts.
 Colleges are maintained by Delhi Administration, which acts as a trust for them.
 Colleges maintained by the University of Delhi.

The colleges maintained by universities get 100% deficit maintenance grant while the colleges run by trusts get 95% deficit grants.

The university has 65 colleges that have liberal courses in humanities, social sciences and science. Twenty-five of these colleges is affiliated with the South Campus while the others are to the North Campus. The total number of colleges under the university is 77 if the colleges that run professional courses are included. Some colleges also offer evening courses. The university includes an undergraduate management college 'Shaheed Sukhdev College of Business Studies, which is ranked as the best B-school in the country at this level, by India Today.

Faculties

The University of Delhi's 86 academic departments are divided into 16 faculties.
 Faculty of Applied Social Sciences & Humanities
 Faculty of Arts
 Faculty of Commerce and Business Studies
 Faculty of Education
 Faculty of Interdisciplinary and Applied Sciences
 Faculty of Law
 Faculty of Management Studies
 Faculty of Mathematical Sciences
 Faculty of Medical Sciences
 Faculty of Music and Fine Arts
 Faculty of Open Learning: The faculty is concerned with distance education.
 Faculty of Science
 Faculty of Social Sciences

In the past, the Faculty of Technology offered courses in Engineering and Technology. The faculty earlier included the Delhi College of Engineering, before it was transformed into the Delhi Technological University and Netaji Subhas Institute of Technology before it was transformed into the Netaji Subhas University of Technology.

Affiliated faculties
The University of Delhi has two affiliated faculties:
Faculty of Ayurvedic & Unani Medicine: The faculty awards degrees to its students in Ayurvedic medicine and Unani medicine.
Faculty of Homoeopathic Medicine: The faculty awards degrees to its students in Homoepathic medicine.

Centres and institutes
There are about 28 centres and institutes at DU. These are divided into four categories:

Postgraduate centres
 Dr. B.R. Ambedkar Centre For Biomedical Research — Dr. B.R. Ambedkar Centre for Biomedical Research is a centre where a multispecialty group of scientists participate in teaching and research in basic and applied biomedical sciences.
 Institute of Informatics and Communication – focuses on the field of communication and information technology.
 Delhi School of Economics: Commonly referred to as DSE, it is a centre of postgraduate learning. Starting in the year 1949, the campus of the Delhi School of Economics houses the University of Delhi's Departments of Economics, Commerce, Sociology and Geography.
 Delhi School of Journalism - The University of Delhi established the Delhi School of Journalism (DSJ) in 2017 and introduced a Five-Year Integrated Course in Journalism.
 School of Open Learning - offer postgraduate courses, degrees and diplomas

Centres
 Cluster Innovation Centre presents its students with an interdisciplinary study system that involves hands-on projects and connects research with application in society. CIC is supported by the National Innovation Council and aided by Union Human Resource Development Ministry.
 Design Innovation Centre (DIC or DUDIC) - A design centre in North Campus established under National Initiative for Design Innovation by Ministry of Human Resource Development. It offers courses for undergraduate and postgraduate students in design thinking, innovation and entrepreneurship. The University of Delhi is the main hub and one of the 5 institutions to be granted the DIC project in the first round.
 D.S. Kothari Centre for Science, Ethics and Education – The objective of Daulat Singh Kothari Centre for Science, Ethics and Education is to raise the standard of living of the people. It is based on science and technology, and education that determines the level of prosperity, welfare and security of the people.
 Agricultural Economics Research Centre – The centre was established and is completely funded by the Ministry of Agriculture of India to carry out research related to the rural economy and agriculture in India. Since then, the centre has completed more than hundreds of policy-oriented studies for the Ministry of Agriculture.
 Centre for Environmental Management of Degraded Ecosystem – The centre works towards strengthening awareness, research and training in priority areas of environmental management of degraded ecosystems. The centre coordinates with the other departments of SES, viz. Department of Environmental Biology and Centre for Interdisciplinary Studies of Mountain & Hill Environment on issues of biodiversity conservation, habitat loss, pollution and rehabilitation of displaced people due to developmental activities.
 Centre for Inter-disciplinary Studies of Mountain & Hill Environment – The concept of the centre revolves around the idea that the upland areas play a crucial role in the production and regeneration of natural resources like fresh water, and forests, besides sustaining a rich genetic diversity of plant and animal life.
 The Centre for Professional Development in Higher Education provides opportunities for professional and career development to teachers across the universities of India. CPDHE helps build competence in research methodologies and pedagogy, and expands technologies in ICT, Science and Technology, Environment and Education.
 The Centre For Science Education & Communication is for the pursuit and teaching of science. It is an autonomous institution in which studies can be carried out by teachers, students and other interested individuals, for the generation of ideas and materials for the improvement of science education at university and school levels; and for the promotion of a wider interest in science and scientific issues, through all means of communications.
 Developing Countries Research Centre – Its objective is to address political and intellectual issues that emerge from the study of the post-colonial world and integrate these insights into teaching at the undergraduate, postgraduate and research levels. Scholars in Political Science, Economics, Sociology, History, Education, philosophy, Psychology and Literature have been involved in the effort.
 The Women's Study Development Centre is the focal point for women's and gender studies in the university. The activities of WSDC place women and gender at the centre of its inquiry focusing mostly on multidisciplinary perspectives of class, caste, race, ethnicity, sexuality, religion, and age. It also addresses other socio-political issues concerning women.
 The University Science Instrumentation Centre (USIC) is a central facility and houses analytical instruments. Its objective is to provide services to all researchers and students of science departments in the university and the constituent colleges of the University of Delhi.

Recognised institutes
 The Institute of Life Long Learning (ILLL) is dedicated to the cause of those who believe that learning is not age-bound nor classroom-bound, but it takes place throughout life and in a variety of situations.
 The Ahilya Bai College of Nursing is a nursing institute. It provides practical exposure to their students, which helps them in acquiring in-depth knowledge of nursing.
 The Amar Jyoti Institute of Physiotherapy offers degrees in physiotherapy.
 The Durgabai Deshmukh College of Special Education is for blind students. The undergraduate course Special Education for Visually Impaired students has a motto to empower visually impaired pupils.
 Pt. Deen Dayal Upadhyaya Institute for the Physically Handicapped is an autonomous organisation under the administrative and financial control of the Ministry of Social Justice & Empowerment, Government of India. It provides education to people with disabilities.
 School of Rehabilitation Sciences – It aims to disseminate knowledge on developmental therapy and special education in rehabilitation sciences.

Affiliated institutions
 Army Hospital (Research & Referral)
 Central Health Education Bureau
 G.B. Pant Hospital
 Hindu Rao Hospital
 Institute of Human Behaviour & Allied Sciences
 Institute of Nuclear Medicine & Allied Sciences
 Kasturba Hospital
 National Institute of Health & Family Welfare
 Nehru Homeopathic Medical College & Hospital

Academics

Courses
There are 240 courses available at the university for undergraduate (UG) and post-graduate (PG).

There are a total 201 courses offered by Delhi University like MBBS, BTech etc. Courses are mainly classified under the three faculties of the central university, including arts, commerce and science.

The university offers 70 post-graduate degrees. DU also offers MPhil in about 28 subjects. In addition to these, it offers 90+ Certificate courses and 28 Diplomas. There are 15 Advanced Diplomas offered in various languages. The university offers PhD courses, which may be awarded by any faculty of the university under ordinance VI-B. But, speciality and super speciality medical degrees like DM, DCh etc., could only be awarded by the faculty of medical sciences. Due to lack of surety in quality of legal education, The Bar Council of India has issued a notification asking Delhi University (DU) to shut down law courses offered in evening shift at its colleges.

Rankings

Internationally, the University of Delhi was ranked 521–530 in the QS World University Rankings of 2023 and 85 in Asia. It was ranked 1001–1200 in the world by the Times Higher Education World University Rankings of 2023, 201–250 in Asia in 2022 and at the same band among emerging economies. It was ranked 601–700 in the Academic Ranking of World Universities of 2022.

In India, it was ranked 23 overall by the National Institutional Ranking Framework in 2022 and 13 among universities.

Sports
Delhi University Stadium is a rugby sevens stadium, situated within the North Campus. Construction began in 2008 and the stadium was inaugurated in July 2010, ahead of the 2010 Commonwealth Games. It also includes a training area for netball, boxing, women's wrestling and athletics.

After the games the stadium was handed over to the university by Commonwealth Games Organising Committee, there after in 2011, the university initiated an upgrade plan, to create a multi-purpose arena with both outdoor and indoor facilities. The university opened access to these facilities in late 2011.

Student life

Students union
Delhi University Students Union, generally abbreviated as DUSU, is a students' union at the University of Delhi. It is an elected body.

Notable alumni and faculty

Notable alumni
Notable alumni in Indian politics include Narendra Modi, the current Prime Minister of India; lawyer and former Minister of Finance Arun Jaitley; Foreign Secretary of India Vijay Keshav Gokhale; former diplomat, writer and Member of Parliament Shashi Tharoor; the fifth President of India Fakhruddin Ali Ahmed; sixth Chief Minister of Delhi Sheila Dikshit; fourth Chief Minister of Uttar Pradesh and India's first woman Chief Minister Sucheta Kriplani; economist and former leader of the Janata Party Subramanian Swamy; fourteenth and current Chief Minister of Odisha Naveen Patnaik; industrialist and former Member of Parliament Naveen Jindal; diplomat and Foreign Secretary Jyotindra Nath Dixit; former Deputy Chairman of the Planning Commission Montek Singh Ahluwalia; former Minister of State for Corporate and Minority Affairs Salman Khurshid; former Former Union HRD Minister Kapil Sibal; former Minister of Information and Broadcasting Ambika Soni; former Union Minister for Disinvestment Arun Shourie; former Chief Minister of Delhi and Governor of Rajasthan Madan Lal Khurana; former MLA of Lakhipur Rajdeep Goala; and president of Jawaharlal Nehru University Students' Union Aishe Ghosh.

DU has educated numerous foreign politicians and heads of state and government including State Counsellor of Myanmar Aung San Suu Kyi, third President of Malawi Bingu wa Mutharika, former Prime Minister of Nepal Girija Prasad Koirala, sixth President of Pakistan Muhammad Zia-ul-Haq, and two former Prime Ministers of Bhutan, Sangay Ngedup, and Khandu Wangchuk.

DU has also produced a large number of major actors and actresses of Indian cinema and theatre including Amitabh Bachchan, Shah Rukh Khan, Manoj Bajpayee, Konkona Sen Sharma, Anurag Kashyap, Arjun Rampal, Imran Zahid, Neha Dhupia, Sakshi Tanwar, Mallika Sherawat, Imtiaz Ali, Huma Qureshi, Siddharth, Sushant Singh Rajput, Shriya Saran, Vishal Bhardwaj, Sandhya Mridul, Aditi Rao Hydari, Shekhar Kapur, Nimrat Kaur, Kabir Khan, Aditi Arya and Sidharth Malhotra. The CWE wrestler Shanky Singh had also pursued B.Com. from Maharaja Agrasen College of Delhi University.

Notable DU alumni in poetry and literature include the Sahitya Akademi Award winning dramatist and playwright Harcharan Singh, the Urdu poet Akhtar ul Iman, and the writers Vikram Seth, Anita Desai, Amitav Ghosh, Kunzang Choden, Upamanyu Chatterjee, Ali Sardar Jafri, and the Padma Vibhushan recipient Khushwant Singh.

Notable alumni in the sciences include physicist Archana Bhattacharyya, theoretical physicist Pran Nath, SLAC physicist Jogesh Pati particle physicist Amitava Raychaudhuri, astrophysicist Vinod Krishan, chemists Charusita Chakravarty and Anil Kumar Tyagi, engineer and "father of the pentium processor" Vinod Dham, mathematician Eknath Prabhakar Ghate, astrophysicist Sangeeta Malhotra, engineer Yogi Goswami, neurosurgeon B. K. Misra

Notable alumni in the humanities and social sciences include professor of economics at Harvard University Gita Gopinath; economist and Senior Vice-president and Chief Economist of the World Bank Kaushik Basu; historians Arundhati Virmani, Ramnarayan Rawat, Upinder Singh and Usha Sanyal; professor of anthropology at Johns Hopkins University Veena Das; Kathak dancer Uma Sharma; Bharatnatyam dancer Geeta Chandran and gender rights activist Meera Khanna.

Notable academics
Notable faculty members of DU include eminent historians like R. S. Sharma and Ramachandra Guha; recipient of the Nobel Memorial Prize in Economic Sciences Amartya Sen; former Prime Minister of India Manmohan Singh; economist and a key architect of the Five-Year Plans of India Sukhamoy Chakravarty; senior fellow for international economics at the Council on Foreign Relations and professor of economics at Columbia University Jagdish Bhagwati; and Ra'ana Liaquat Ali Khan, a leading woman figure in the Pakistan Movement and wife of the first Prime Minister of Pakistan Liaquat Ali Khan.

Startup Culture
Delhi University has produced several successful entrepreneurs who have founded innovative startups. Some of the top startups founded by Delhi University alumni include Zomato, founded by Deepinder Goyal and Pankaj Chaddah in 2008, which has now become one of the leading food-tech companies in India; InMobi, founded by Naveen Tewari in 2007, which has become one of the world's largest independent mobile advertising companies; and Go-MMT, founded by Dhruv Shringi, Manish Amin, and Sabina Chopra in 2005, which operates popular online travel portals such as MakeMyTrip and Goibibo. It has also seen the emergence of successful AI startups founded by its alumni, such as Write+ by Shailesh Jaiswal & Smridhi Seth.These startups have not only made a significant impact on the Indian economy but also on the global market.

See also
 Delhi University Community Radio
 Jawaharlal Nehru University
 Jamia Millia Islamia
 List of colleges affiliated to the Delhi University
 List of institutions of higher education in Delhi
 University of Oxford v. Rameshwari Photocopy Service

References

External links

 

 
U
Central universities in India
Commonwealth Games rugby union venues
University of Delhi
University of Delhi
Recipients of the Maulana Abul Kalam Azad Trophy
BSL3 laboratories in India